Uralops is an extinct genus of trilobite in the family Pterygometopidae.

References

Pterygometopidae
Articles created by Qbugbot